Bilateral relations exist between Australia and Mexico. Both nations are members of the Asia-Pacific Economic Cooperation, G-20 major economies, MIKTA, Organisation for Economic Co-operation and Development, Trans-Pacific Partnership, and the World Trade Organization.

History 
In the beginning, diplomatic relations between Mexico and Australia were conducted via London as Australia was part of the British Empire. In the late 1930s, Mexico established an honorary consulate in Sydney; however during the outbreak of World War II, Mexico closed its consulate. Both Australian and Mexican troops fought together in Philippines Campaign during the war to liberate the country from Japanese forces. In 1960, Mexico re-opened its consulate in Sydney which led to formal diplomatic relations being established between the two nations on 14 March 1966. That same year, Mexico opened an embassy in Canberra.

In 1973, Prime Minister Gough Whitlam became the first Australian head-of-government to pay an official visit to Mexico. In 1990,  Carlos Salinas de Gortari became the first Mexican President to visit Australia. In 2016, both nations celebrated 50 years of diplomatic relations.

High-level visits

High-level visits from Australia to Mexico

 Prime Minister Gough Whitlam (1973)
 Prime Minister Malcolm Fraser (1981)
 Prime Minister John Howard (2002)
 Prime Minister Julia Gillard (2012)
 Governor-General Peter Cosgrove (2015)

High-level visits from Mexico to Australia

 President Carlos Salinas de Gortari (1990)
 President Felipe Calderón (2007)
 President Enrique Peña Nieto (2014)

Agreements
Both nations have signed several bilateral agreements such as an Agreement on Technical and Scientific Cooperation (1981); Extradition Treaty (1990); Agreement on Cooperation in the peaceful uses of Nuclear Energy (1992); Agreement on the avoidance of Double-Taxation (2002); Agreement on the Promotion and Protection of Investments (2005); Agreement on Energy (2005); Agreement on Education (2008); Agreement on Air Services (2010); Agreement on Agriculture (2010) and an Agreement on Mining (2010).

Tourism
In 2016, approximately 85,000 Australian citizens visited Mexico for tourism. At the same time, approximately 8,800 Mexican citizens visited Australia.

Trade 
In 2018, two-way trade between both nations amounted to US$1.4 billion. Australia's exports to Mexico amounted to US$598 million and include: aluminium, medicaments, copper ores and concentrates. Mexico's exports to Australia amounted to US$1.05 billion and its export products include: lead ores and concentrates, telecom equipment and parts, fertilizers and passenger motor vehicles. Australia is Mexico's 24th biggest export market and Mexico is Australia's 25th biggest export market, respectively. Since 2012, Australia, Mexico and eight other countries have been negotiating what is known as the Trans-Pacific Partnership (TPP) trade agreement. The trade negotiations were completed in February 2016 and has yet to enter into force.

Drug trafficking
It has been reported that the Sinaloa Cartel  had operatives in Australia and were behind a number of significant cocaine hauls intercepted by Australian authorities. In 2011, the Sinaloa cartel attempted to set up an outpost in Sydney but were thwarted by a police operation. However, in 2016 it was reported that the Sinaloa cartel was responsible for 60% of the cocaine market in  Australia and shipped AUD100 million worth a month.

In 2014, it was reported that "Violent Mexican cartels with links to Australian crime gangs are infiltrating the nation's illicit drug trade."  The chief of the Australian Crime Commission said "Recently, we've seen the emergence of Mexican cartel activity within Australia"  the Crime Commission also noted  "Mexican criminals have become more prevalent as principals in the importation and supply of cocaine and associated money laundering" in Australia.

In May 2015, the United Nations Office on Drugs and Crime warned that Mexican drug cartels were targeting criminals in Australia to import ice into the country. The Office said cartels were involved in trafficking methamphetamine and were actively seeking partners in Australia.

In 2016, the Australian Federal Police reported that a "significant amount of methamphetamine coming into Australia may originate in Mexico." A report by the University of Canberra found that the cartels "have already established linkages in the Asia-Pacific and are attempting to expand these with a particular focus on penetrating the Australian market."

Resident diplomatic missions 
 Australia has an embassy in Mexico City.
 Mexico has an embassy in Canberra.

See also
 List of ambassadors of Australia to Mexico

References

External links 
Australian Ministry of Foreign Affairs and Trade on relations with Mexico
Australian Government on strengthening political relations with Mexico
Mexican Secretary of Foreign Affairs on bilateral relations with Australia (Spanish)

 
Mexico
Bilateral relations of Mexico